František Čuba (23 January 1936, in Březová – 28 June 2019) was a Czech politician who served as a Senator.

References

1936 births
2019 deaths
Members of the Senate of the Czech Republic
People from Zlín District
Czech University of Life Sciences Prague alumni